Carnimonas is a genus in the phylum Pseudomonadota (Bacteria).

Etymology
The name Carnimonas derives from:
 Latin noun caro carnis, flesh, meat; Latin feminine gender noun monas (μονάς), nominally meaning "a unit", but in effect meaning a bacterium; New Latin feminine gender noun Carnimonas, a monad of meat.

Members of the genus Carnimonas can be referred to as carnimonad (viz. Trivialisation of names).

Species
The genus contains a single species, namely C. nigrificans ( Garriga et al. 1998,  (Type species of the genus).;: Latin participle adjective nigrificans, making black.)

See also
 Bacterial taxonomy
 Microbiology

References 

Bacteria genera
Monotypic bacteria genera
Oceanospirillales